Calvin Thomas Coffey (born January 27, 1951) is an American rower who competed in the 1976 Summer Olympics. He was born in Norwich, Connecticut. In 1976 he and his partner Mike Staines won the silver medal in the coxless pairs event.

More recently, Calvin Coffey survived a life-threatening car crash.

Calvin Coffey was the maker of CTC racing shells, and pioneered the use of composite materials in rowing equipment.

References

External links
 

1951 births
Living people
Rowers at the 1976 Summer Olympics
Olympic silver medalists for the United States in rowing
American male rowers
Medalists at the 1976 Summer Olympics
Pan American Games medalists in rowing
Pan American Games bronze medalists for the United States
Rowers at the 1971 Pan American Games
20th-century American people